Anilios torresianus, also known as the Torres Strait blind snake or north-eastern blind snake (and, formerly, the southern New Guinea blind snake) is a species of blind snake that is native to Australia and New Guinea. The specific epithet torresianus refers to the type locality.

Description
The snake grows to an average of about 25 cm, and a maximum of 40 cm, in length.

Behaviour
The species is oviparous.

Distribution
The species occurs in southern Papua New Guinea and along the north-eastern coast of Queensland. The type locality is Murray Island in the Torres Strait Island Region of Far North Queensland.

References

 
torresianus
Snakes of Australia
Reptiles of Queensland
Snakes of New Guinea
Taxa named by George Albert Boulenger
Reptiles described in 1889